Sharon Horne may refer to:
 Sharon Horne (curler)
 Sharon Horne (psychologist)